Alexander Clarke (11 June 1853 – 8 April 1917) was a Guyanese cricketer. He played in eleven first-class matches for British Guiana from 1894 to 1902.

See also
 List of Guyanese representative cricketers

References

External links
 

1853 births
1917 deaths
Guyanese cricketers
Guyana cricketers